The Hydra class are a group of four frigates in service with the Hellenic Navy. They were designed in Germany and are part of the MEKO group of modular warships, in this case the MEKO 200 design. The programme was authorised in 1988 and partially paid for with FMS aid and provisioned for the commission of six vessels. The first ship was built in Germany and commissioned in 1992 but suffered a serious fire while working up near Portland, England. Repairs were completed in 1993. The Greek built warships were delayed due to financial problems on the part of the Hellenic Shipyards completing in the late 1990s which also led to limiting the total number of vessels to four mainly after the acquisition of eight  frigates from the Netherlands in the late 1990s.

Upgrade programs
In 2007, an upgrade of the STIR fire control system to allow the firing of the RIM-162 ESSM surface-to-air missile was launched.  was the first to be upgraded and, in August 2008, successfully completed a live firing test. The other three Hydra vessels were upgraded during 2008.

On April 25, 2018 the Greek defense minister Panos Kammenos announced that the modernization of the four vessels is in progress but without presenting any further details about the program.

In May 2019, the Joint Chiefs of General Staff Council (ΣΑΓΕ) decided the commencement of the modernization program for the four ships of the class.

Ships

See also
 List of naval ship classes in service
  - built for Portugal
  - built for Australia and New Zealand
  - Built for the Turkish Navy
  - MEKO A-200 frigates built for the South African Navy

Gallery

References

Sources
 Conway's All the World's Fighting Ships 1947-1995
 Hellenic Navy website

Naval ships of Greece
 
Frigate classes